Perris is a surname. Notable people by that name include:

 Chad Perris (born 1992), vision-impaired Australian athlete
 Edouard Perris (1808–1878), French explorer and entomologist
 Frank Perris (1931–2015), British former Grand Prix motorcycle road racer
 Fred T. Perris (1837–1916), Chief Engineer of the California Southern Railroad
 Giorgos Perris (born 1983), Greek pop singer
 Samuel Perris (1840–?), French-Canadian burglar, safe cracker and bank robber